Turba is a small borough in Saue Parish, Harju County, Estonia. Prior to the administrative reform of Estonian local governments in March 2017, Turba belonged to Nissi Parish. As of 2011 Census, the settlement's population was 927. In 2019, the population was found to have risen to 964.

Science journalist and humorist Tiit Kändler was born in Turba.

Turba railway station re-opened on 8 December 2019 after being closed to passenger services since September 1995.

References

Boroughs and small boroughs in Estonia
Populated places in Harju County
Saue Parish